Holborough Marshes is a   nature reserve on the outskirts of Snodland, south-west of  Chatham in Kent. It is managed by Kent Wildlife Trust. It is part of Holborough to Burham Marshes Site of Special Scientific Interest.

The marshes have a variety of wetland habitats, freshwater marshes, woodland, reedbeds, which are brackish and tidal, wet grassland, scrub, and freshwater and saline dykes. There are water voles, and birds include reed buntings and sedge warblers.

The site is open to the public.

References

Kent Wildlife Trust
Snodland